Walerian Antoni Stroynowski (14 April 1759 - 12 November 1834) was a Polish nobleman, politician, and economist. He was a deputy to the Great Sejm (1788-1791), where he supported the Constitution of 3 May 1791 reform movement. In addition to political reform, he also advocated physiocracy. He was an author of a number of letters, speeches, and pamphlets.

References

1759 births
1834 deaths
18th-century Polish nobility
Members of the Great Sejm
Polish economists
Signers of the Polish Constitution of May 3, 1791
Recipients of the Order of the White Eagle (Poland)
19th-century Polish nobility